Saint Ruelin (or Saint Rivelin) succeeded Saint Tudwal as Bishop of Tréguier in the sixth century.

Ruelin was a student of the Breton monk Tudwal who had established a hermitage on an island off the coast of North Wales.

Around 540, he immigrated with Tudwal to Armorica. Ruelin founded a hermitage, later a monastery, at present-day Châteauneuf-du-Faou. When Tudwal was dying, the priests asked him to select a successor, and he named Ruelin. His election was contested by Saint Pergat, canon and archpriest of Lexobie. who won a part of the clergy and the people to his cause. To remedy this schism, a synod was assembled at Lexobie, where the most skillful and learned ecclesiastics of the diocese were convoked to resolve the dispute. It took an appearance from Tudwal for Pergat to retire, ending his days in penance at Pouldouran.

References

Medieval Breton saints